Kyzan (also known as Qyzan (Qızan, قىزان)) is a town in Mangystau Region, southwest Kazakhstan.

References

Mangystau Region
Cities and towns in Kazakhstan